The Pink Poodle was an iconic motel in Surfers Paradise, Queensland, Australia. It was located on the corner of Fern Street and the Gold Coast Highway. Although no longer extant, its signage remains and is listed on the Gold Coast Local Heritage Register.

History 
The Pink Poodle was built in 1967 and features a neon sign of a pink poodle. Many felt it was synonymous with the "glitzy" allure of the Gold Coast and it was frequently used as an image to depict the Gold Coast. The motel was demolished in 2004 but the sign was preserved and relocated a short distance to 18 Fern Street. A bar and restaurant in the new development that replaced it bears the name "The Pink Poodle".

In 2005, the National Trust of Queensland nominated the sign to be one of Queensland's Heritage Icons.

In 2015, the signage appeared on a postage stamp issued by Australia Post as part of its Signs of the Times series.

In popular culture 
In 1995, author Matthew Condon published a novel, A Night at the Pink Poodle, about the rise and fall of a Gold Coast highrise apartment salesman.

References

External links

 Google Street View of the sign

Hotels in Queensland
Surfers Paradise, Queensland
Gold Coast Local Heritage Register
Motels
Individual signs in Australia
1967 establishments in Australia
Pink Poodle
Pink Poodle
Hotel buildings completed in 1967
Hotels disestablished in 2004
Demolished hotels in Australia
Defunct hotels in Australia